Izabella Yaylyan (born 4 January 1995) is an Armenian weightlifter. In 2021, she represented Armenia at the 2020 Summer Olympics in Tokyo, Japan. She finished in 7th place in the women's 59 kg event.

She won the gold medal in her event at both the 2014 European Junior & U23 Weightlifting Championships held in Limassol, Cyprus and the 2015 European Junior & U23 Weightlifting Championships held in Klaipeda, Lithuania. In 2017, she won the bronze medal in the women's under-23 58kg event at the 2017 European Junior & U23 Weightlifting Championships held in Durrës, Albania.

At the 2021 European Weightlifting Championships in Moscow, Russia, she won the silver medal in the women's 55kg Snatch event.

References

External links 
 

Living people
1995 births
Place of birth missing (living people)
Armenian female weightlifters
Olympic weightlifters of Armenia
Weightlifters at the 2020 Summer Olympics
21st-century Armenian women